{{DISPLAYTITLE:C11H18N4O3}}
The molecular formula C11H18N4O3 may refer to:

 Argpyrimidine, an advanced glycation end-product
 Imuracetam, a drug of the racetam family

Molecular formulas